Maria Emilia Archer Eyrolles Baltasar Moreira, known to her readers as Maria Archer (4 January 1899 – 23 January 1982), was a writer and activist from Lisbon, Portugal.

Biography 
Born in Lisbon, Archer lived most of her life outside of Portugal. As a result of her parents' frequent journeys with their children, she did not finish elementary school until she was much older than normal students making her essentially a self-taught writer. Reportedly, she started creating verse as a young child although no evidence of those poems remain. 

In 1910, her parents moved the family to Mozambique, Africa. She was the first-born of six children. The family returned to Portugal in 1914, but two years later they were back in Africa, this time in Guinea-Bissau.

In 1921, while her father was on a trip to Portugal, Maria Archer married a Portuguese man, Alberto Teixeira Passos and the young couple took up residence on the island of Ibo in Mozambique. Five years later, after the fall of the democratic regime there and the subsequent crisis, her husband lost his job at a bank and the two moved to Faro, Portugal. In 1931, the marriage ended and they divorced.

Writings 
As a single woman, she returned to Africa to live with her parents in Luanda, Angola, where she began her literary career in earnest. She started attending writing conferences and her first published work appeared in magazines.

She called her first book, Três Mulheres (Three Women), a soap opera, which was published in the same volume that contained a police adventure story by António Pinto Quartin, A Lenda e o Ação do Estranho Caso de Pauling.

She returned to Lisbon, where she began a period of intense writing activity, producing works describing her experience in Africa. In 1945, she also became an activist, joining the group called Movement of Democratic Unity (MUD), consisting of those opposed to the repressive regime of President Salazar in Portugal. 

After she gained recognition as an activist, she began having problems with the political police. Her works were censored and her novel Casa Sem Pão (1947) was seized. According to the writer Dina Botelho,"She closely followed the trial of the challenger of the Salazar dictatorship, Captain Henrique Carlos Galvão at the Military Court of Santa Clara. Having proposed to write a book about it, she saw her home invaded by the International Police and State Defense (PIDE) shortly after the end of the trial in 1953. She did eventually publish it in 1959, in Brazil, under the title The Last Days of Portuguese Fascism".Unable to make money from her writings in Portugal, she left for Brazil, on 5 July 1955 and arrived ten days later.

Exiled 
While in Brazil, she "lived poor and sick," but she still wrote for some newspapers there, collaborating with O Estado de S. Paulo, Semana Portuguesa and Portugal Democrático and Revista Municipal  de Lisboa (1939–1973). Her themes included both African-subjects as well as works opposing the Portuguese dictatorship. She also collaborated with Brazilian magazines such as, Portugal Colonial (full title: Colonial Portugal: Review on Colonial Expansion and Propaganda) (1931–1937) as well as the Portuguese-Brazilian magazine Atlântico: revista luso-brasileira.

During her years in self-imposed exile, she is said to have completed five books and published them in Brazil, but records of only four exist.

Later years 
By the end of her writing career, Archer had produced more than 30 works ranging over many different genres including a children's adventure novel, novels for adults and plays. Some of her work was republished in multiple editions.

Finally, in 1979, she returned to Lisbon for the last time, moving into a long-term residential care facility called Manor of Santa Maria de Marvila on 26 April. There she spent the last three years of life. She died in 1982 at 83 years of age.

Tributes 
Writer João Gaspar Simões, in 1930 wrote of her, "I don't even know another (Portuguese writer) who, with the audacity of themes and ideas, combines such an energetic and personal expression. Her style breathes strength and solidity."

Selected works 
Archer's work resulted in "impressive output, which included novels, short fiction, essays and plays."
 Três Mulheres (Three Women) (com Pinto Quartim Graça) - Luanda, 1935
 África Selvagem (Wild Africa) - Lisboa, Guimarães & lda, 1935
 Sertanejos - Lisboa, Editorial Cosmos, 1936
 Singularidades de Um País Distante (Singularities of a Distant Country) - Lisboa, Editorial Cosmos, 1936
 Ninho de Bárbaros (Barbarian's Nest) - Lisboa,Editorial Cosmos, 1936
 Angola Filme (Angola Movie) - Lisboa, Editorial Cosmos,1937
 Ida e Volta duma Caixa de Cigarros (Roundtrip from a Cigarette Box) - Lisboa, Editorial O Século, 1938
 Viagem à Roda de África (Journey to the Wheel of Africa) - romance de aventuras infantis, Lisboa, Editorial O Século, 1938
 Colónias Piscatórias em Angola (Fishing Colonies in Angola) - Lisboa, Cosmos, 1938
 Caleidoscópio Africano (African Kaleidoscope) - Lisboa, Edições Cosmos, 1938
 Há dois Ladrões sem Cadastro (There are Two Thieves without Registration) - Lisboa, Editora Argo, 1940
 Roteiro do Mundo Português (Portuguese World Tour) - Lisboa, Edições Cosmos, Lisboa, 1940
 Fauno Sovina - Lisboa, Livraria Portugália, 1941
 Memórias da Linha de Cascais (Memories of the Cascais Line) - com Branca de Gonta Colaço, Lisboa, parceria António Maria Pereira, 1943
 Os Parques Infantis, (The Children's Parks) Lisboa - Associação Nacional dos Parques Infantis, 1943
 Ela É Apenas Mulher (She's Just a Woman) - com António Maria Pereira, Lisboa, 1944
 Aristocratas (Aristocrats) - Lisboa, Editorial Aviz, 1945
 Eu e Elas, Apontamentos de Romancista (Me and They, Novelist Notes) - Lisboa, Editorial Aviz, 1945
 A Morte Veio de Madrugada (Death Came at Dawn) - Coimbra, Coimbra Editora Lda, 1946
 Casa Sem Pão - Lisboa, Empresa Contemporânea de Edições, 1947
 Há-de Haver uma Lei (There Will Be a Law) - Lisboa, Edição da Autora, 1949
 O Mal Não Está em Nós (Evil Is Not in Us) - Porto, Livraria Simões Lopes, 1950
 Filosofia duma Mulher Moderna (Philosophy of a Modern Woman), Porto, Livraria Simões Lopes, 1950
 Bato às Portas da Vida - Lisboa, Edições SIT, 1951
 Nada lhe Será Perdoado (Nothing Will Be Forgiven) - Lisboa, Edições SIT, 1953
 A Primeira Vítima do Diabo (The Devil's First Victim) - Lisboa, Edições SIT, 1954
 Terras onde se fala Português (Lands where Portuguese is spoken) - Rio de Janeiro, Ed. Casa do Estudante do Brasil, 1957
 Os Últimos Dias do Fascismo Português (The Last Days of Portuguese Fascism) - S. Paulo, Editora Liberdade e Cultura, 1959
 África Sem Luz (Africa Without Light) - São Paulo, Clube do Livro, 1962
 Brasil, Fronteira da África (Brazil, Frontier of Africa) - São Paulo, Felman-Rêgo, 1963
 Herança Lusíada - Lisboa, Edições Sousa e Costa, s.d.

Plays 

 Alfacinha - comedy in one act for a single character, published in Sol, 1949
 Isto que Chamam Amor (This They Call Love) - drama in one act for a single character.
 Numa Casa Abandonada (In an Abandoned House) - drama in one act for a single character.
 O Poder do Dinheiro (The Power of Money) - comedy in three acts
 O Leilão (The Auction) - drama in three acts

References 

1899 births
1982 deaths
People from Lisbon
Portuguese feminists
Portuguese writers
20th-century Portuguese women writers
20th-century Portuguese writers
Portuguese children's writers
Portuguese women novelists